George Brunner may refer to:

 George Brunner (bishop) (1889–1969), Roman Catholic bishop of Middlesbrough
 George E. Brunner (1896–1975), American politician from New Jersey
 George Brunner (composer), American composer and performer